The Staffordshire Potteries is the industrial area encompassing the six towns Burslem, Fenton, Hanley, Longton, Stoke and Tunstall, which is now the city of Stoke-on-Trent in Staffordshire, England. North Staffordshire became a centre of ceramic production in the early 17th century, due to the local availability of clay, salt, lead and coal.

Spread
Hundreds of companies produced all kinds of pottery, from tablewares and decorative pieces to industrial items.  The main pottery types of earthenware, stoneware and porcelain were all made in large quantities, and the Staffordshire industry was a major innovator in developing new varieties of ceramic bodies such as bone china and jasperware, as well as pioneering transfer printing and other glazing and decorating techniques.  In general Staffordshire was strongest in the middle and low price ranges, though the finest and most expensive types of wares were also made.

By the late 18th century North Staffordshire was the largest producer of ceramics in Britain, despite significant centres elsewhere.  Large export markets took Staffordshire pottery around the world, especially in the 19th century.  Production had begun to decline in the late 19th century, as other countries developed their industries, and declined steeply after World War II.  Some production continues in the area, but at a fraction of the levels at the peak of the industry.

History
The boom came after the discovery in 1720 by potter John Astbury of Shelton, that by adding heated and ground flint powder to the local reddish clay he could create a more palatable white or Creamware. The flint was sourced from either the South Coast of England or France, then shipped to the Port of Liverpool or to Shardlow on the River Trent. A group involving James Brindley later patented a water based process that reduced the generation of fine siliceous dust, so lessening the risk to workers of suffering silicosis. In the early 1900s the process was converted to grinding bone, which had a similar effect.

With the coming of pottery products distribution by railway that began in the 1840s, mainly by the London and North Western Railway and Midland Railway, there was a considerable increase in business.

Potteries active in the 19th century include Spode, Aynsley, Burleigh, Doulton, Dudson, Mintons, Moorcroft, Davenport, Twyford, and Wedgwood.

The Chartist 1842 General Strike was ignited by striking collieries in the Potteries, and led to the 1842 Pottery Riots.

Heron Cross Pottery

William Hines and his brother Thomas Hines established the pottery Hines Brothers in Fenton, Stoke-on-Trent and built Heron Cross Pottery in 1886, particularly making the classic brown earthenware teapots and tea services for the London Midland and Scottish Railway. The business was taken over in 1907 and became the Kensington Pottery in Hanley in about 1922: this pottery continued until 1937.

It is understood that in about 1850 William Hines was born either in Ellesmere, Staffordshire or in St Oswalds, Welsh Marches. He married Mary Mellor on 10 March 1875 and remarried when she died (reportedly not until the evening of his marriage telling his second wife that he already had six children). He became a prominent rider in the North Staffordshire Hunt and owner of a stable of horses. He spent considerable money building Wesleyan chapels. There is a Hines Street in Fenton.

See also
 :Category:Staffordshire pottery
 Stoke-on-Trent Built-up Area
 Gladstone Pottery Museum
 Bottle oven
 Ceramic and Allied Trades Union
 Trent and Mersey Canal
 Staffordshire figure
 Staffordshire dog figurine
 Edwin Bennett, apprenticed here together with his brothers
 Arnold Bennett, wrote extensively on the region

References

Further reading
 Beaver, Stanley H. "The Potteries: A Study in the Evolution of a Cultural Landscape" Transactions and Papers (Institute of British Geographers), No. 34 (Jun., 1964), pp. 1–31 online, with maps, diagrams and photographs
 Dawson Aileen, "The Growth of the Staffordshire Ceramic Industry", in Freestone, Ian, Gaimster, David R. M. (eds), Pottery in the Making: World Ceramic Traditions, 1997, British Museum Publications, 
 Dolan, Brian. Wedgwood: The First Tycoon  (2004). 
 McKendrick, Neil. "The Victorian View of Midland History: A Historiograpidcal Study of the Potteries." Midland History 1.1 (1971): 34–47.
 Meiklejohn, A. "The Successful Prevention of Lead Poisoning in the Glazing of Earthenware in the North Staffordshire Potteries" British Journal of Industrial Medicine 20#3 (1963), pp. 169–180 online
 Reilly, Robin. Josiah Wedgwood 1730-1795 (1992), scholarly biography
 Shaw, Simeon. History of the Staffordshire Potteries: And the Rise and Progress of the Manufacture of Pottery and Porcelain; with References to Genuine Specimens, and Notices of Eminent Potters (Scott, Greenwood, & Son, 1900) online.
 Weatherill, Lorna. The pottery trade and North Staffordshire, 1660-1760 (Manchester University Press, 1971).
 Wedgewood, Josiah C.  Staffordshire Pottery and its History (1913) 229pp; covers the development of English pottery, the history of the pottery families, and the evolution of the pottery industry; online

External links

 The Potteries website.
 The Potteries Museum & Art Gallery.
 

History of ceramics
History of Stoke-on-Trent
British porcelain
Staffordshire pottery
Potteries Urban Area